Lundh's test is a test of function of the exocrine function of the pancreas gland.

The exocrine role of the pancreas involves release of various digestive enzymes, including lipase and proteases, such as trypsin, in response to hormonal stimulation after eating. Disorders of the pancreas including chronic pancreatitis, cystic fibrosis and pancreatic cancer can lead to decreased pancreatic exocrine activity.

Lundh's test involves placing a tube with multiple channels in to the duodenum. This tube has holes in the stomach and in the duodenum. A meal consisting of proteins, carbohydrates and fats is injected into the stomach. Typically a prokinetic medication such as metoclopramide is administered to accelerate passage of the food into the duodenum. A sample of the duodenal juice is taken at the 30 minute mark, and then every 30 minutes until the two hour mark. The activity of trypsin is measured and averaged among the 4 collections. A positive test is defined by low trypsin activity on the average of the samples, and is suggestive of decreased exocrine function of the pancreas.

A positive Lundh's test is indicative of decreased exocrine function of the pancreas, but theoretically may be positive if there is lack of release of cholecystokinin.

References

Endocrinology
Medical procedures